Ram On may refer to:
Ram-On, a moshav in the Ta'anakh region
"Ram On" (song), a 1971 song by Paul McCartney from his Ram album